is a Japanese voice actress. She works for Aoni Production. She graduated from Aoyama Gakuin University.

Filmography

Anime
Remy in Getter Robo Go
Miyoko's mother (3rd Voice) and Yūki Uehara (2nd Voice) in Kiteretsu Daihyakka
Female Student B (ep. 21) in Oniisama e...
Hiromi Matsuno (ep 21); Nana Asahina/Oniwabandana (ep 43) in Pretty Soldier Sailor Moon
Unazuki Furuhata in Pretty Soldier Sailor Moon R
Unazuki Furuhata in Pretty Soldier Sailor Moon SuperS
Princess Momomo in Tomatoman
Jan in Transformers: Victory
Princess Peach, Kinopio, Morton Koopa Jr., and Wendy O. Koopa in Amada Anime Series: Super Mario Bros.

Non-anime roles
System voice in Dead or Alive video games except for Dead or Alive Xtreme, Dead or Alive X2 and Dead or Alive 5.
System voice in Double Dragon for Neo Geo.

References

The Oracle
Profile at Aoni Production
Miyako Endo at MobyGames

External links
 
Miyako Endô at IMDB

Japanese voice actresses
1965 births
Living people
Aoyama Gakuin University alumni
Aoni Production voice actors